In number theory, cuspidal representations are certain representations of algebraic groups that occur discretely in  spaces. The term cuspidal is derived, at a certain distance, from the cusp forms of classical modular form theory. In the contemporary formulation of automorphic representations, representations take the place of holomorphic functions; these representations may be of adelic algebraic groups.

When the group is the general linear group , the cuspidal representations are directly related to cusp forms and Maass forms. For the case of cusp forms, each Hecke eigenform (newform) corresponds to a cuspidal representation.

Formulation
Let G be a reductive algebraic group over a number field K and let A denote the adeles of K.  The group G(K) embeds diagonally in the group G(A) by sending g in G(K) to the tuple (gp)p in G(A) with g = gp for all (finite and infinite) primes p. Let Z denote the center of G and let ω be a continuous unitary character from Z(K) \ Z(A)× to C×.
Fix a Haar measure on G(A) and let L20(G(K) \ G(A), ω) denote the Hilbert space of complex-valued measurable functions, f, on G(A) satisfying
f(γg) = f(g) for all γ ∈ G(K) 
f(gz) = f(g)ω(z) for all z ∈ Z(A)

 for all unipotent radicals, U, of all proper parabolic subgroups of G(A) and g ∈ G(A).
The vector space L20(G(K) \ G(A), ω) is called the space of cusp forms with central character ω on G(A). A function appearing in such a space is called a cuspidal function. 

A cuspidal function generates a unitary representation of the group G(A) on the complex Hilbert space  generated by the right translates of f.
.

The space of cusp forms with central character ω decomposes into a direct sum of Hilbert spaces

where the sum is over irreducible subrepresentations of L20(G(K) \ G(A), ω) and the m are positive integers (i.e. each irreducible subrepresentation occurs with finite multiplicity). A cuspidal representation of G(A) is such a subrepresentation (V) for some ω.

The groups for which the multiplicities m all equal one are said to have the multiplicity-one property.

See also
 Jacquet module

References
James W. Cogdell, Henry Hyeongsin Kim, Maruti Ram Murty. Lectures on Automorphic L-functions (2004), Section 5 of Lecture 2.

Representation theory of algebraic groups